The 1954 Paris–Roubaix was the 52nd edition of the Paris–Roubaix, a classic one-day cycle race in France. The single day event was held on 11 April 1954 and stretched  from Paris to the finish at Roubaix Velodrome. The winner was Raymond Impanis from Belgium.

Results

References

1954
1954 in road cycling
1954 in French sport
1954 Challenge Desgrange-Colombo
April 1954 sports events in Europe